Amon Buchanan (born 10 October 1982) is a former Australian rules football who played for the Brisbane Lions and the Sydney Swans in the AFL. He is currently serving as the forwards coach of the Greater Western Sydney Giants.

AFL career

Sydney

Buchanan grew up in the Victorian town of Colac, west of Melbourne. He played football for Colac and the Geelong Falcons Under 18's team, winning a premiership with the Falcons in 2000 and subsequently being selected by the Sydney Swans in the post-season National Draft. He made his senior debut in Round 11 of the 2002 season against West Coast. By the end of 2002, he had played six matches, but had a disappointing season the next year, suffering knee and ankle injuries, not playing a single senior game and being delisted. However, he was redrafted by the Swans, and had established himself as a regular member of the team by the second half of 2004. During Sydney's 2005 premiership-winning season, Buchanan played in every match, making useful contributions in the midfield and kicking the final goal of the Grand Final against West Coast. He was also called a "weak dog" by 's Mark Johnson during the season.

In 2007, Buchanan became the first Swan to be suspended since early 2005. He was also suspended for four matches in Round 15, 2008 for reckless conduct against Hawthorn's Luke Hodge.

Brisbane Lions

He was given the number 33 guernsey, vacated by Rhan Hooper and made famous by Darryl White. He made his debut for the Lions in their Round 1, 2010 clash against West Coast at the Gabba.
He retired from AFL football at the end of the 2012 season.

Post-playing career 
In 2013 Buchanan joined the Greater Western Sydney Giants as a development coach. He has since moved into the role of forwards coach at the club.

Personal life 

Sporting blood runs in Amon's family with brothers Liam Buchanan, a state cricketer for the Victorian Bushrangers, and Meyrick Buchanan, representing Melbourne Renegades in the 2011–12 Big Bash League.

Statistics

|- style="background-color: #EAEAEA"
! scope="row" style="text-align:center" | 2002
|style="text-align:center;"|
| 32 || 6 || 1 || 2 || 15 || 20 || 35 || 11 || 3 || 0.2 || 0.3 || 2.5 || 3.3 || 5.8 || 1.8 || 0.5
|-
! scope="row" style="text-align:center" | 2003
|style="text-align:center;"|
| 32 || 0 || — || — || — || — || — || — || — || — || — || — || — || — || — || —
|- style="background:#eaeaea;"
! scope="row" style="text-align:center" | 2004
|style="text-align:center;"|
| 32 || 16 || 6 || 6 || 78 || 98 || 176 || 29 || 49 || 0.4 || 0.4 || 4.9 || 6.1 || 11.0 || 1.8 || 3.1
|-
! scope="row" style="text-align:center" | 2005
|style="text-align:center;"|
| 32 || 26 || 14 || 18 || 231 || 199 || 430 || 83 || 80 || 0.5 || 0.7 || 8.9 || 7.7 || 16.5 || 3.2 || 3.1
|- style="background:#eaeaea;"
! scope="row" style="text-align:center" | 2006
|style="text-align:center;"|
| 32 || 24 || 13 || 8 || 249 || 183 || 432 || 104 || 96 || 0.5 || 0.3 || 10.4 || 7.6 || 18.0 || 4.3 || 4.0
|-
! scope="row" style="text-align:center" | 2007
|style="text-align:center;"|
| 32 || 16 || 6 || 8 || 149 || 146 || 295 || 81 || 45 || 0.4 || 0.5 || 9.3 || 9.1 || 18.4 || 5.1 || 2.8
|- style="background:#eaeaea;"
! scope="row" style="text-align:center" | 2008
|style="text-align:center;"|
| 32 || 20 || 14 || 11 || 156 || 181 || 337 || 98 || 64 || 0.8 || 0.6 || 7.8 || 9.1 || 16.9 || 4.9 || 3.2
|-
! scope="row" style="text-align:center" | 2009
|style="text-align:center;"|
| 32 || 8 || 2 || 3 || 45 || 90 || 135 || 27 || 37 || 0.3 || 0.4 || 5.6 || 11.3 || 16.9 || 3.4 || 4.6
|- style="background:#eaeaea;"
! scope="row" style="text-align:center" | 2010
|style="text-align:center;"|
| 33 || 12 || 9 || 3 || 67 || 89 || 156 || 48 || 37 || 0.8 || 0.3 || 5.6 || 7.4 || 13.0 || 4.0 || 3.1
|-
! scope="row" style="text-align:center" | 2011
|style="text-align:center;"|
| 33 || 5 || 0 || 1 || 26 || 48 || 74 || 15 || 18 || 0.0 || 0.2 || 5.2 || 9.6 || 14.8 || 3.0 || 3.6
|- style="background:#eaeaea;"
! scope="row" style="text-align:center" | 2012
|style="text-align:center;"|
| 33 || 1 || 0 || 1 || 7 || 12 || 19 || 2 || 2 || 0.0 || 1.0 || 7.0 || 12.0 || 19.0 || 2.0 || 2.0
|- class="sortbottom"
! colspan=3| Career
! 134
! 66
! 61
! 1023
! 1066
! 2089
! 498
! 431
! 0.5
! 0.5
! 7.6
! 8.0
! 15.6
! 3.7
! 3.2
|}

References

External links 

 
 Amon Buchanan at Sydneyswans.com.au

1982 births
Living people
Australian rules footballers from Victoria (Australia)
Sydney Swans players
Sydney Swans Premiership players
Brisbane Lions players
Geelong Falcons players
Colac Football Club players
People from Colac, Victoria
Australia international rules football team players
One-time VFL/AFL Premiership players